The New Alliance Party (PNA or PANAL) is a state-level (previously national, until 2018) political party in Mexico founded in 2005.

Its creation was proposed by the Sindicato Nacional de Trabajadores de la Educación (SNTE, National Union of Education Workers), the largest trade union in Latin America, led by Elba Esther Gordillo, the controversial former general secretary of the Institutional Revolutionary Party (PRI).

History

The New Alliance Party achieved its official registry on July 14, 2005, three years after the SNTE created the Asociación Ciudadana del Magisterio (ACM, Citizen Association of Teachers), a political group recognized by the Federal Electoral Institute since August 2002. The creation of this party by the SNTE, a group that had traditionally supported the PRI in every election, caused accusations of treason for Gordillo.

The party's president is Jorge Kahwagi. On 8 January 2006, the PNA elected Roberto Campa as its candidate for president in the 2006 general elections. In the 2006 legislative elections the party won nine out of 500 seats in the Chamber of Deputies and one out of 128 Senators. In the 2009 legislative elections the party lost one seat in the Chamber of Deputies, leaving it with eight seats. In the 2012 legislative elections, PANAL won 2 seats in the Senate (an overall loss of 3), and 10 seats in the Chamber of Deputies (an overall gain of 3).

The party logo distinctly resembles that of the now-defunct Canadian Alliance, a conservative party active from 2000 to 2003.  The logo was provided by an ad agency, purported to resemble a dove.  Despite the discovery of the logo's resemblance to that of the Canadian Alliance (leading one founding member of the party to express feeling "robbed"), it was nonetheless adopted.  The party's 2012 presidential candidate, Gabriel Quadri, appeared in a wetsuit at his campaign launch, as did Canadian Alliance leader Stockwell Day.

In 2018, the party entered into coalition with the PRI and Green Party (PVEM) to support the nomination of José Antonio Meade. Meade finished a distant third behind Andrés Manuel López Obrador, but the results for New Alliance were worse. The party failed to attract three percent of the vote in all three elections for president, proportional representation federal deputies, and senators, which under Mexican law prompts the loss of its federal registry and the appointment of a liquidator by the INE to dispose of the party's assets. Nueva Alianza and the Social Encounter Party, the other party to lose its registry after the 2018 elections, challenged the result, to no avail. The PNA was officially dissolved at the national level on 3 September 2018, although it is still officially registered as a party in several individual states, and operates as a political organization in the others.

Electoral history

Presidential elections

Congressional elections

Chamber of Deputies

Senate elections

References

Further reading
Panal history (in Spanish) Retrieved Dec 16, 2018

 
Political parties disestablished in 2018